Usurbil is a railway station in Usurbil, Basque Country, Spain. It is owned by Euskal Trenbide Sarea and operated by Euskotren. It lies on the Bilbao-San Sebastián line.

History 
The station opened in 1895 as part of the San Sebastián-Zarautz stretch of the San Sebastián-Elgoibar railway.

Services 
The station is served by Euskotren Trena line E1. It runs every 30 minutes (in each direction) during weekdays, and every hour during weekends.

References

External links
 

Euskotren Trena stations
Railway stations in Gipuzkoa
Railway stations in Spain opened in 1895